To trip the light fantastic is to dance nimbly or lightly, or to move in a pattern to musical accompaniment

Trip the Light Fantastic may refer to:

 Trip the Light Fantastic (Sophie Ellis-Bextor album), 2007
 Trip the Light Fantastic (Ladybug Mecca album), 2005
 Tripping the Light Fantastic (album), 1997, by Lit
 "Tripping the Light Fantastic", a 1995 song by BT from Ima
 "Trip the Light Fantastic", a 2021 song by Greta Van Fleet from The Battle at Garden's Gate

See also
 Light Fantastic (disambiguation)
 Tripping the Live Fantastic, a 1990 album by Paul McCartney